Chema Rodríguez may refer to:

 Chema Rodríguez (filmmaker) (born 1967), Spanish filmmaker and writer
 Chema Rodríguez (handballer) (born 1980), Spanish handball player
 Chema Rodríguez (footballer) (born 1992), Spanish football defender